Arddhanaari  is a 2016 Indian Telugu-language vigilante action drama film written and directed by Bhanushanker Chowdary. The film stars newcomers Arjun Yajath as Transgender and Mouryaani. The film was dubbed into Hindi under the same name by Wide Angle Media Pvt. Ltd.

Summary

Arddhanaari revolves around the protagonist who takes the disguise as Hijra and leads the fight against social injustice and turns punisher as well.

Reception

Arddhanaari was released in 300 screens with mixed reviews. Indiaglitz rated the film with 2.5/5 stars stating that the film may enjoyed by C-class audience for its outmoded narration style, while iluvcinema gave 3 stars mentioning it as an interesting, realistic revenge story of a transgender.

Awards and nominations

References

External links 
 

2010s Telugu-language films
Indian action drama films
Cross-dressing in Indian films
2016 action drama films